The Arcadia Formation is a geological formation located within central-eastern Queensland, Australia, which has been aged between the Induan–Olenekian epoch of the Early-Triassic period. It is most well known for its abundance of Early-Triassic aged fossils, most notably its high diversity of amphibians.

Description
The Arcadia Formation is a sequence of sandstones and mudstones deposited as a result of freshwater rivers and lakes during the Induan–Olenekian epoch. The Arcadia Formation represents one of the oldest known Mesozoic formations within the entirety of Australia, as well as containing relatively well-preserved specimens for its age and country. At the time at which the Arcadia Formation was building up, the then region of today's Australia was still recovering from the recent Permian–Triassic extinction event which had resulted in the global biodiversity remaining at a low level throughout much of the lower Triassic. The world currently was generally a hot and arid environment reaching an average temperature of more than 80o S. This is suggested by the red color of sediments found within the Bowen Basin.

The fauna and flora from the formation are not abruptly unique in comparison to the known fauna or flora from the rest of the world at this time, however the Arcadia Formation has an unusually high diversity of amphibians, with 90% of the fauna from the Arcadia Formation being made up of amphibians. So far, the formation's fauna is known to consist of brachiopods, fish, amphibians, reptiles and synapsids. There is also a high diversity of ichnotaxa based on coprolites.

Vertebrate paleofauna

Fish

Amphibians

Reptiles

Synapsids

References 

Geologic formations of Australia
Triassic Australia
Induan
Olenekian
Mudstone formations
Sandstone formations
Siltstone formations
Fluvial deposits
Lacustrine deposits
Paleontology in Queensland